Akiko Kobayashi is the name of:
, Japanese scientist and professor
, Japanese singer, songwriter, composer and arranger
, Japanese voice actress and singer